Euptera knoopi, or Knoop's euptera, is a butterfly in the family Nymphalidae. It is found in Nigeria (Ubiaja and Ikom). The habitat consists of forests.

References

Butterflies described in 1998
Knoopi
Endemic fauna of Nigeria
Butterflies of Africa